The International Islamic University Malaysia (Jawi: اونيۏرسيتي اسلام انتارابڠسا مليسيا), also known as IIUM, is a public university in Malaysia. Headquartered in Gombak, Selangor, IIUM has six other campuses all over Malaysia: two medical-centric campuses and a Centre for Foundation Studies in Gambang, Pahang, two city campuses in Kuala Lumpur, and a language and tourism campus in Pagoh, Johor.

The university is sponsored by eight governments and the Organisation of the Islamic Cooperation (OIC). It is distinct from the International Islamic University Islamabad, Pakistan and International Islamic University Chittagong, Bangladesh.

The university was established on 23 May 1983 and founded upon Islamic principles.  Islamic values are inculcated into all disciplines. IIUM offers bachelor's, master's and doctoral degrees courses at its 14 faculties or "Kulliyyah" ("Kulliyyat", in plural).

Since 1987, IIUM has produced more than 70,000 graduates and undergraduates from more than 100 countries around the world. Most of them were from Malaysia.

History
Prime minister Mahathir Mohamad conceived the idea for an international institution of Islamic education in 1982 during a meeting between OIC leaders about the Islamization of knowledge. The idea was shared with the then-minister of education, Sulaiman Daud; the then-director-general of education, Murad Mohamed Nor; and two others. Mohamed Kamal Hassan, then of the National University of Malaysia, along with a senior academic official who attended the meeting, produced the first working paper on the concept of the university.

IIUM was once a private university. As the university's language of instruction was not to be Malay but instead English and Arabic, which was initially prohibited by Malaysian law, IIUM was initially incorporated under the currently-repealed Companies Act 1965. However, IIUM was officially made a public university on 23 May 1983, by Section 5A (2) of the Universities and University Colleges Act 1971, when the university received its establishment order from the then King, Ahmad Shah of Pahang, after an exchange of diplomatic notes of co-sponsorship between the government of Malaysia, seven other governments and OIC.

A batch of 153 students from Malaysia and abroad were enrolled for the first academic session, which started on 8 July 1983. Courses were conducted under the Faculty of Economics, the Faculty of Laws, the Centre for Fundamental Knowledge, and the Centre for Languages. The members of this first batch received their degrees and diplomas during the first convocation held on 10 October 1987. 68 graduates were conferred the degree of Bachelor of Economics, 56 other graduates received the degree of Bachelor of Laws, and 29 Qadhis were conferred Diploma in Law and Administration of Islamic Judiciary.

Governance
As a public university, IIUM has a ceremonial head called the constitutional head who presides over convocations and serves as the point of reference for all constitutional issues. Equivalent to the chancellor in other public universities, they are appointed by the King on the recommendation of the federal government for a term of seven years.

Ahmad Shah of Pahang was the founding constitutional head since 1 July 1983. Before his death, he was replaced by her daughter-in-law, the current Queen, Tunku Azizah Aminah Maimunah Iskandariah. She was made the constitutional head on 12 April 2019 for a five-year term, ending her father-in-law's chancellery in IIUM for 36 years, but the instrument of appointment was only presented to her by the federal government on 17 June 2019.

As a federal statutory body, IIUM operates under the supervision of a board of governors, a body that directs and supervises all affairs of the university. The board is chaired by a president who is appointed by the constitutional head on the advice of the federal government for a five-year term. By tradition, the secretary-general of the Ministry of Education is deputy chairman of the board. Other than the president and a deputy chairman, the board comprises 15 members, including the secretary-general of OIC and diplomatic heads of member states, i.e. Bangladesh, Egypt, Libya, the Maldives, Pakistan, Saudi Arabia and Turkey. Mohd. Daud Bakar, an Islamic finance expert in Malaysia, sits as the eighth and current president since 1 July 2019.

The board of governors is assisted by a senate, a body that provides for academic and student affairs of the university, and a management committee that oversees the day-to-day operation of the university. Both the Senate and the management committee are chaired by a rector who is appointed by the constitutional head on the advice of the federal government for a three-year term.

Leaders since 1983

Board of governors 
, IIUM board of governors comprises:

 Mohd. Daud Bakar, president of IIUM (chairman)
 Mohd. Gazali Abas, secretary-general, Ministry of Education (deputy chairman)
 Dzulkifli Abdul Razak, rector of IIUM
 Azah Hanim Ahmad, secretary, International Division, Ministry of Finance
 Yousef Ahmed Al Othaimeen, Secretary General, Organisation of Islamic Cooperation
 Mahmoud H. S. Qattan, ambassador of Saudi Arabia to Malaysia
 Gamal Abdelrahim Mohamed Metwally, ambassador of Egypt to Malaysia
 Md. Shahidul Islam, high commissioner of Bangladesh to Malaysia
 Merve Safa Kavakçı, ambassador of Turkey to Malaysia
 Mohammad Nafees Zakaria, high commissioner of Pakistan to Malaysia
 Mohamed Fahmy Hassan, ambassador of Maldives to Malaysia
 Abdul Rashid Hussain, founder, RHB Bank, Malaysia
 Syed Hussin Abdul Kadir, chairman, Federal Territories Islamic Affairs Council, Malaysia
 Khalek Awang, advocate and solicitor, Khalek Awang and Associates, Malaysia
 Amer Bukvić, president of the management board, Bosna Bank International, Bosnia and Herzegovina
 Jamalludin Ab. Rahman, lecturer, Kulliyyah of Medicine, IIUM
 Wan Mohd Zulhafiz bin Wan Zahari, lecturer, Ahmad Ibrahim Kulliyah of Laws, IIUM (company secretary)
 Abdul Rahim Ahmad, executive director, Management Services Division, IIUM (secretary of the board)

Management 
, IIUM management committee comprises:

 Dzulkifli Abdul Razak, rector
 Ahmad Faris Ismail, deputy rector (academic and industrial linkages)
 Ahmad Hafiz Zulkifly, deputy rector (responsible research and innovation)
 Zulkifli Hasan, deputy rector (student development and community engagement)
 Ahmad Faris Ismail, covering deputy rector (internationalisation and global networking)
 Abdul Rahim Ahmad, executive director, management services division
 Ahmad Zailan Shaari, executive director, finance division
 Mohd. Hilmi Wan Kamal, Executive Director, Planning and Development Division
 Kamaruzzaman Yunus, Kuantan campus director
 Badrol Hisham Raja Mohd. Ali, legal adviser
 Norbik Bashah Idris, chief information officer

Campus

IIUM is headquartered at a 700-acre (2.8 km²) campus at Gombak, Selangor and has six other campuses. Three of campuses are in Kuantan, Pahang, with the Centre for Foundation Studies situated at Gambang, medical-centric campus situated at Bandar Indera Mahkota and clinical campus situated near Tengku Ampuan Afzan Hospital. Two city campuses are located at Persiaran Duta and Jalan Damansara, Kuala Lumpur, and another campus is located at Bandar Universiti Pagoh, Johor.

Centres of studies 
IIUM has 14 following faculties. Each of them is, in Arabic, called "Kulliyyah" ("Kulliyyat" in plural):

 Ahmad Ibrahim Kulliyyah of Laws (AIKOL) – Gombak
 Kulliyyah of Allied Health Sciences (KAHS) – Kuantan
 Kulliyyah of Architecture and Environmental Design (KAED) – Gombak
 Kulliyyah of Dentistry (KOD) – Kuantan
 Kulliyyah of Economics and Management Sciences (KENMS) – Gombak
 Kulliyyah of Education (KOED) – Gombak
 Kulliyyah of Engineering (KOE) – Gombak
 Kulliyyah of Information and Communication Technology (KICT) – Gombak
 AbdulHamid AbuSulayman Kulliyyah of Islamic Revealed Knowledge and Human Sciences (AHAS KIRKHS) – Gombak
 Kulliyyah of Languages and Management (KLM) – Pagoh
 Kulliyyah of Medicine (KOM) – Kuantan
 Kulliyyah of Nursing (KON) – Kuantan
 Kulliyyah of Pharmacy (KOP) – Kuantan
 Kulliyyah of Science (KOS) – Kuantan

There have been, however, other academic centres that are not equivalent to a Kulliyyah but offered pre-university, undergraduate and postgraduate courses:

 Academy of Graduate and Professional Studies (ACADEMY) – Gombak and Kuala Lumpur
 Centre for Foundation Studies (CFS) – Gambang
 Centre for Languages and Pre-University Academic Development (CELPAD) – Gombak, Kuantan and Pagoh
 Institute of Islamic Banking and Finance (IIiBF) – Gombak
 International Institute of Halal Research and Training (INHART) – Gombak
 International Institute of Islamic Civilization and Malay World (ISTAC) – Kuala Lumpur

Facilities

ICT facilities
IIUM has online services, such as i-Ma'luum, in which IIUM students can check and organise their personal schedules and information in a centralized online database. IIUM has an e-learning and online community portal (called i-Ta'leem), where students can organise and coordinate their schedules, announcements and activities.

Library
IIUM has six libraries. The main library, the Dar al-Hikmah Library, is situated at Gombak Campus together with IIUM Institute of Islamic Banking and Finance Library, and satellite libraries are located at Kuantan Campus, Centre for Foundation Studies at Gambang, Kulliyyah of Languages and Management at Pagoh, and Syed Muhammad Naquib al-Attas Library at Kuala Lumpur.

Cultural Centre
IIUM Cultural Centre is the university's biggest centre, used as a venue for the annual convocation ceremony. ICC can be converted to an examination venue. Cultural performances, talks and seminars have been held at the centre.

Azman Hashim Complex
The Azman Hashim Complex is a RM 7-million multipurpose hall and commercial centre that serves the needs of IIUM students. It is also a revenue source for the IIUM Endowment Fund.

Sports complexes
IIUM has four sport complexes. Two sports complexes are built separately for male and female students at Gombak Campus. Two other sports complexes are situated at Kuantan Campus and Centre for Foundation Studies at Gambang.

Hostel facilities
The students’ residential colleges in IIUM are known as "Mahallah" ("Mahallat", in plural), which is ‘neighbourhood’ in Arabic. IIUM residential colleges are self-contained not only with services but also activities, and are named after the leading companions of the Prophet and the female Mujahidah and Syuhada. Since the early years of its establishment, IIUM has practised full accommodation for its full-time undergraduate students. For postgraduate students, accommodation is provided based on availability of rooms. Priority is given to non-Malaysian students, especially students from the newest intake.

Health facilities

Since 2016, IIUM has a teaching hospital called "IIUM Medical Centre" at Kuantan. Other than the teaching hospital, IIUM has a number of clinics and a specialist medical centre which are also at Kuantan, a Health and Wellness Centre at Gombak and a satellite clinic at Centre for Foundation Studies at Gambang.

Sultan Haji Ahmad Shah Mosque
Sultan Haji Ahmad Shah Mosque is located at the centre of Gombak Campus. The mosque's main prayer hall has a maximum capacity of 9000 people, with female prayer halls on the second and third levels. The mosque organises lectures, seminars and classes on concepts such as marriage and Janazah management, Tilawah and Tahfiz Al-Qur'an, as well as activities such as Qiyamullail and Tarbiyyah and training for students.

Sultan Haji Ahmad Shah Mosque was also built in Kuantan Campus.

Academics

Students
IIUM started with 153 students in 1983. Today, approximately 3,000 students enrol each year. There have been, so far, approximately 27,000 students from over 40 Muslim majority countries studying in IIUM, as well as students from non-Muslim majority countries, such as Germany, Finland, China, South Korea, Japan, India, United States of America, Russia, Thailand, Laos, Cambodia, Burma, Vietnam, Sri Lanka and the Philippines.

From 1987 to 2012, 60,785 graduates and postgraduates have completed their studies at IIUM. Out of this, 53,241 were from Malaysia while 7,530 were international students. Having graduates all over the world, IIUM has established alumni chapters in Thailand, Bosnia and Herzegovina, Indonesia, Maldives, Australia, Saudi Arabia, Oman and Singapore. Branches of alumni chapters have also been opened in Turkey, China, Nigeria, the Philippines, Yemen, Brunei, Senegal, South Africa, Sri Lanka, Bangladesh, Gambia, Guinea and the United Arab Emirates.

Medium of instruction
The medium of instruction is English, with Arabic used in courses related to the study of Islamic sciences like theology, jurisprudence and ethics. Basic Arabic is a compulsory course. In addition, basic Malay language is compulsory for international undergraduate students.

Usrah 
IIUM is the only public university in Malaysia that requires all of its foundation and undergraduate students to attend Usrah, i.e. Islamic study circle held weekly for the purpose of social, spiritual and intellectual enhancement. Since the establishment of IIUM, Usrah has been a requirement for students to graduate from IIUM. Since 2014, a separate Usrah has been held at residential colleges in addition to centralised Usrah, which is also compulsory to intermediate undergraduate students living in campus.

Achievements

Awards and recognition 
IIUM has been well-known locally and internationally in the field of debate, public speaking and mooting. In 2014, IIUM was ranked tenth out of 440 teams participated in the 35th World Universities Debating Championship. In 2016, IIUM won the United Asian Debating Championship, the Australasian Intervarsity Debate Championship, and the Asian British Parliamentary Championship. In 2017, IIUM was made the runner-up of World Universities Arabic Debating Championship.

Other than joining and winning multi-level tournaments, IIUM has been successful in producing quality debaters and orators of Malay, English and Arabic languages, like Syed Saddiq Syed Abdul Rahman, Ameera Natasha Moore, Mubarrat Wassey (for English), Abdul Muiz Mustafa, Mohd. Sharul Nizam Md. Roni (for Malay), Muhammad Nurfirman Mohamed and Muhammad Ikmal Hakimi Mohd. Helni (for Arabic).

In the field of research, IIUM have received recognition at regional and international level by winning gold, silver and bronze medals at exhibitions and expos, including PENCIPTA, INPEX, ITEX Geneva and KIPA. IIUM entered the inaugural Proton Green Mobility Challenge 2012 (PGMC) when the University's entry, an electric powered Proton Saga BLM named "Smart Mobility" became the overall champion and also took "Farthest Distance" and "Fastest Two Laps Challenge" award.

IIUM was involved in the creation of the Malaysian Shariah Index with collaboration from JAKIM and YADIM which Malaysia will be the first country in the world to adopt it. The index will measure the compliance of eight fields – judiciary, politics, economics, health, education, culture, infrastructure and environment, and social – with “maqasid syariah”, or the intentions of Shariah. The Malaysian Shariah Index was officially launched by the Prime Minister of Malaysia on 10 February 2015.

Rankings
IIUM is considered one of the top five Islamic universities of the world and has been recognized as “The Premier International Islamic Research University” by the Islamic Educational, Scientific and Cultural Organization. In addition, it is one of the best public universities in Malaysia with a specific mission of Integration, Islamization, Internationalization and Comprehensive Excellence.

Notable alumni

Alumni include:
 Adnan Yaakob
 Asyraf Wajdi Dusuki
 Fong Po Kuan
 Halim Rane
 Husnu Al Suood
 Ismail Omar
 Irmohizam Ibrahim
 Khalid Abu Bakar
 Mohamed Jameel Ahmed
 Asri Zainul Abidin 
 Mohamed Hanipa Maidin
 Muhammad bin Ibrahim
 Omar Suleiman
 Tengku Amalin A’ishah Putri
 Wong Kah Woh
 Yasir Nadeem al Wajidi
 Syed Saddiq

Notable faculty members

Current faculty members 

 Abdul Rashid Moten, professor of KIRKHS, political scientist
 Abdullah al-Ahsan, professor of KIRKHS, contemporary Muslim historian
 Awang Sariyan, professor of ISTAC, Malay language scholar and Director-General of Dewan Bahasa dan Pustaka, Malaysia (2012-2016)
 Irwandi Jaswir, professor of KOE, world Halal scientist
 Jamal Ahmed Bashier Badi, professor of KIRKHS, critical and creative thinking expert
 Majdi Ibrahim, professor of KIRKHS, Arabic language expert
 Mashkuri Yaacob, professor of KOE, electrical engineering expert and Vice Chancellor of Universiti Tenaga Nasional, Malaysia (2007-2015)
 Nik Ahmad Kamal Nik Mahmod, senior professor of AIKOL, constitutional expert 
 Roosfa Hashim, associate professor of KICT, Malay laureate
 Rosnani Hashim, senior professor of KOED, scholar of Islamic education in Malaysia
  Shamrahayu Abdul Aziz, associate professor of AIKOL, constitutional expert
 Syed Arabi Syed Abdullah Idid, senior professor of KIRKHS, media and communication expert and Rector of IIUM (2006-2011)
 Torla Hassan, senior professor of KOE, physics expert
 Zaleha Kamarudin, professor of AIKOL, family law expert and Rector of IIUM (2011-2018)

Former faculty members 

 Abdul Aziz Bari, lecturer and professor of AIKOL (1989-2011), MLA for Tebing Tinggi, Perak and member of Perak State Executive Council, Malaysia (since 2018)
 Abdul Hamid Ahmad Abu Sulayman, Rector of IIUM (1988-1998)
 Ahmad Mohamed Ibrahim, founding Dean of AIKOL, Attorney-General of Singapore (1959-1967)
 Ahmet Davutoğlu, lecturer of political science at KIRKHS (1993-1996), Prime Minister of Turkey (2014-2016)
 Ataul Huq Pramanik, Professor of Economics at KENMS (1988-2018)
 Mahmood Zuhdi Abdul Majid, senior professor of KIRKHS (2012-2015), Islamic law expert
 Maszlee Malik, lecturer of KIRKHS (2002-2018), MP for Simpang Renggam, President of IIUM and Minister of Education, Malaysia (since 2018)
 Mohammad Hashim Kamali, professor of Islamic law at AIKOL and ISTAC (1985-2007), CEO of International Institute of Advanced Islamic Studies (since 2007)
 Mohd. Kamal Hassan, Rector of IIUM (1999-2006)
 Muhammad Arif Zakaullah, professor of KENMS, founder of IIUM debating team
 Muhammad Uthman El-Muhammady, top academic fellow of ISTAC (until 2013), scholar of Islamic thoughts and Da'awah
 Sidek Baba, senior professor of KOED, scholar of Islamic thought and Malaysian education
 Syed Muhammad Naquib al-Attas, founder of ISTAC, then visiting professor at UTM
 Ismawi bin Zen, Former Deputy Rector (1999-2005), Head Panelist for the expansion of MasjidilHaram, Tokoh Maal Hijrah Sarawak 2010

References

External links

 

Organisation of Islamic Cooperation affiliated agencies
 
1983 establishments in Malaysia
Educational institutions established in 1983
Islamic universities and colleges in Malaysia
Universities and colleges in Selangor